The East African highland shrew (Crocidura allex) is a species of mammal in the family Soricidae. It is found in Kenya and Tanzania. Its natural habitats are subtropical or tropical moist montane forests, high-elevation grassland, and swamps.

References

Crocidura
Mammals described in 1910
Taxonomy articles created by Polbot